Lincoln Christian School is a private, non-denominational PK-12 Christian school located in Lincoln, Nebraska on a 30-acre campus. The school was founded in 1951. It has almost 800 students and 80+ staff members.

External links
Lincoln Christian School

References

Christian schools in Nebraska
Nondenominational Christian schools in the United States
Private elementary schools in Nebraska
Private high schools in Nebraska
Private middle schools in Nebraska
Schools in Lincoln, Nebraska